Nakarin is a Thai given name. Notable people with the name include:

Nakarin Atiratphuvapat (born 1996), Thai motorcycle racer
Nakarin Fuplook (born 1983), Thai footballer

Thai given names